Eudesmia praxis is a moth of the subfamily Arctiinae first described by Herbert Druce in 1894. It is found in Mexico.

References

Eudesmia
Moths described in 1894